Csilla Bátorfi (born 3 March 1969 in Szombathely) is a Hungarian table tennis player. She competed at five consecutive Olympic Games from 1988 (when the sport first appeared at the Games) to 2004. She won several titles in European Championships.

She is the first female table tennis player to compete at five Olympics. Six men share this honor with her: Swede Jörgen Persson, Croatian Zoran Primorac, Belgian Jean-Michel Saive, Serbian-American Ilija Lupulesku, Swede Jan-Ove Waldner, and German Jörg Roßkopf.

She was named Hungarian Sportswoman of The Year in 1986 after becoming European champion the same year.

See also
List of athletes with the most appearances at Olympic Games

References

1969 births
Living people
Hungarian female table tennis players
Olympic table tennis players of Hungary
Table tennis players at the 1988 Summer Olympics
Table tennis players at the 1992 Summer Olympics
Table tennis players at the 1996 Summer Olympics
Table tennis players at the 2000 Summer Olympics
Table tennis players at the 2004 Summer Olympics
Sportspeople from Szombathely